Guryev is a Russian-language surname. The feminine form is Guryeva. It can refer to:

People

Guryev
Andrey Guryev (b. 1960), Russian businessman
Andrey Guryev Jr., Russian businessman
Dmitry Guryev (1758–1825), Russian statesman and Minister of Finance
Stepan Guryev (1902–1945), Soviet general, Hero of the Soviet Union

Guryeva
Lyudmila Guryeva (b. 1977), Kazakhstani biathlete
Maria Nesselrode, née Guryeva (1786–1849), Russian courtier and lady-in-waiting
Polina Guryeva (b. 1999), Turkmen weightlifter
Yelena Guryeva (b. 1958), Russian field hockey player

Places
Guryev, the name of the Kazakh city of Atyrau between 1708 and 1992 

Russian-language surnames